Jesse Carter Little (September 26, 1815 – December 26, 1893) was a Mormon pioneer and a member of the presiding bishopric of the Church of Jesus Christ of Latter-day Saints (LDS Church).

Little was born in Belmont, Maine. In 1845, Little was taught by Latter Day Saint missionary(Latter Day Saints Eli P. Maginn; he was baptized into the LDS Church and in 1846 was made a president of the church's missions in the eastern United States.

In 1846, Little met with United States President James K. Polk and former Post Master General, Amos Kendall asking for help for the emigrating members of the LDS church to the west. During this time, Little was advised by Thomas L. Kane, a Pennsylvania lawyer. When help was not forthcoming, Little wrote a letter to Polk saying he would go across the trackless ocean for help if none was provided by the United States. This resulted in a call for a battalion of Mormons for the war against Mexico. Once he was promised this help, Little traveled from Washington, D.C., to Nauvoo, Illinois, and from there to Omaha, Nebraska. While Little was traveling to the Mormon camp, Colonel Kearney, commander of Fort Leavenworth, was authorized to create the battalion and sent Captain James Allen to recruit the Mormon Battalion. Little was the liaison for the LDS Church with Kane when he became involved in assisting the church in its relations with the U.S. government.

In 1847, Little served as adjutant to Brigham Young who led a company of Mormon pioneers from Winter Quarters, Nebraska, to the Salt Lake Valley. Shortly after arriving in Salt Lake City, Little returned to the eastern United States and continued to act as a mission president. Little's tenure as mission president ended in 1852, and he moved to Utah Territory.

Little was educated at Ipswich Academy in New Hampshire and served as a school teacher for a year near Peterborough, New Hampshire. He was a farmer, blacksmith and sleigh and wagon builder. He worked as a clerk in a dry good store in Boston and later, he and Leonard Hardy, had a store in Peterborough. In Salt Lake City he served as an attorney, sexton, marshal, tax appraiser, military officer and fire chief. In 1880, he entered into an agreement with Samuel Brannan to colonize and portion of Northern Mexico. This effort failed. "In Zion's Cause the Life of Jesse Carter Little"

On October 6, 1856, Little became the second counselor to the presiding bishop of the LDS Church, Edward Hunter. Little acted in this capacity until his resignation in the summer of 1874; he was eventually replaced in the presiding bishopric by Robert T. Burton.

Little moved to Morgan County, Utah, and lived in Littleton, a town that was named after him which he had helped establish. He died in Salt Lake City, Utah Territory, and was buried at Salt Lake City Cemetery.

Like many early members of the LDS Church, Little practiced plural marriage. He had three wives and 27 children.

Notes

References
 Andrew Jenson. Latter-day Saint Biographical Encyclopedia 1:242, 3:151, 4:711

External links
 Grandpa Bill's G.A. Pages: Jesse Carter Little

1815 births
1893 deaths
19th-century Mormon missionaries
American Mormon missionaries in the United States
American general authorities (LDS Church)
Burials at Salt Lake City Cemetery
Converts to Mormonism
Counselors in the Presiding Bishopric (LDS Church)
Latter Day Saints from Maine
Latter Day Saints from Utah
Mission presidents (LDS Church)
Mormon pioneers
People from Morgan County, Utah
People from Waldo County, Maine
Religious leaders from Maine